The Chordettes were an American female vocal quartet, specializing in traditional pop music. They are best known for their 1950s hit songs "Mr. Sandman" and "Lollipop".

Career
The group organized in Sheboygan, Wisconsin, in 1946. The original members of the group were Janet Ertel (née Buschmann; September 21, 1913 – November 22, 1988), Alice Mae Buschmann Spielvogel (July 31, 1925 – January 6, 1981), Dorothy "Dottie" (Hummitzsch) Schwartz, and Jinny Osborn/Lockard (April 25, 1927 – May 19, 2003). Alice Spielvogel was replaced by Carol Buschmann, her sister-in-law, in 1947. In 1952, Lynn Evans (née Hargate; May 2, 1924 – February 6, 2020) replaced Schwartz, as Evans described in a 2015 interview. And in 1953, Margie Needham replaced Osborn (who was having a baby), though Osborn later returned to the group. Nancy Overton joined the group for live performances in 1957 after Janet Ertel, who was more than a decade older than the other members of the group, decided to retire from touring, although Ertel continued to perform on recorded material. Originally they sang folk music in the style of The Weavers, but eventually changed to a harmonizing style of the type known as barbershop harmony or close harmony. Part of this change seems to be influenced by Osborn's father.

Jinny Osborn was born in Seattle, Washington. She was born Virginia Cole, the daughter of O. H. "King" Cole, who was president (1948-1949) of the Barbershop Harmony Society (then known as SPEBSQSA), and Katherine Flack.

After performing locally in Sheboygan, they won on Arthur Godfrey's radio program Talent Scouts in 1949. They held feature status on Godfrey's daily program, and in 1950 cut their first LP, a collection of standards titled Harmony Time for Columbia Records. Three more LPs followed.

In 1953, Godfrey's music director and orchestra leader, Archie Bleyer, founded Cadence Records. He signed a number of Godfrey regulars and former regulars, including the Chordettes, who had a number of hit records for Cadence.

Beginning in January 1954, the group sang on the Robert Q. Lewis Show, a weekday afternoon program on CBS-TV.

The Chordettes had released a couple of singles with Arthur Godfrey on Columbia in 1950-51 but didn't cut a solo single until their breakout hit Mr. Sandman, released in late 1954 and which went on to become a #1 1955 hit. Archie Bleyer himself is on that record along with the group; Bleyer stripped down the sound to highlight the girls' voices. They also hit #2 with 1958's "Lollipop" and also charted with a vocal version of the themes from Disney's Zorro (U.S. #17) (1958) and the film Never on Sunday (U.S. #13) (1961). Other hits for the group included "Eddie My Love" (U.S. #14) (a cover of a song by doo-wop group The Teen Queens), "Born to Be With You" (U.S. #5), "Lay Down Your Arms" in 1956, and "Just Between You and Me" (U.S. #8) in 1957. Their cover of "The White Rose Of Athens" hit the Australian Top 15 in May, 1962. The US single "In The Deep Blue Sea" was a one-week Music Vendor entry four months later (#128).

Janet Ertel married Bleyer in 1954. Her daughter Jackie married another Cadence recording star, Phil Everly of The Everly Brothers.

The Chordettes appeared on American Bandstand on August 5, 1957, the first episode of that show to be broadcast nationally on the ABC Television Network. The Chordettes also appeared on American Bandstand on February 22, 1958, and again on April 26, 1958.

In 1961, Jinny Osborn again left the group. Unable to find a satisfactory replacement, the group disbanded in 1963.

Recent events
The group was inducted into the Vocal Group Hall of Fame in 2001.

The longest living member of the Chordettes who has sung on all the group's recordings, on both Columbia and Cadence recordings, is Carol Buschmann. Lynn Evans Mand sang on all the Chordettes' Cadence Recordings. In 2004, Mand appeared on a PBS television special Magic Moments: The Best of 50s Pop, with other 1950s pop icons, singing "Lollipop". Margie Needham Latzko and Carol Buschmann are the only surviving singers who recorded both "Mr. Sandman" and “Lollipop”.

Deaths
Alice Mae Buschmann Spielvogel died in 1981.

Janet Ertel Bleyer died on November 22, 1988, at the age of 75.

Jinny Osborn (later known as Jinny Janis) died in 2003.

Nancy Overton died on April 5, 2009, after a long battle with esophageal cancer.

Dorothy "Dottie" (Hummitzsch) Schwartz died on April 4, 2016.

Lynn Evans Mand died on February 6, 2020, at the age of 95.

Discography

Albums
 Harmony Time (1950)
 Harmony Time Volume II (1951)
 Harmony Encores (1952)
 The Chordettes Sing Your Requests (1953)
 The Chordettes (1955)
 Listen (1955)
 Close Harmony (1955)
 The Chordettes (1957) CLP 3001
 Drifting and Dreaming (1959)
 Never on Sunday (1959)
 Never on Sunday (1962)

Singles

See also
 List of vocal groups
 List of artists who reached number one in the United States
 List of acts who appeared on American Bandstand

Notes

References

External links

Picture and names of The Chordettes
'The Chordettes' Vocal Group Hall of Fame Page
 
 The Chordettes' page on the Primarily A Cappella site
 Chordette Lynn Evans harmonizes in classroom while a teacher
 The Chordettes : Official Covers Discography
 Carol Buschmann Interview NAMM Oral History Library (2010)
 Dorothy Schwartz Interview NAMM Oral History Library (2010)
Chordettes collection of musical arrangements, 1938-1995 at the Library of Congress

Apex Records artists
Cadence Records artists
Vocal quartets
Barbershop quartets
Doo-wop musicians
Traditional pop music singers
American pop music groups
American girl groups
Sheboygan, Wisconsin
Musical groups from Wisconsin
Musical groups established in 1946
Musical groups disestablished in 1961
Columbia Records artists